Events from the year 1949 in North Korea.

Incumbents
Premier: Kim Il-sung 
Supreme Leader: Kim Il-sung

Events

Births

 Hwang Pyong-so

See also

Years in Japan
Years in South Korea

References

 
North Korea
1940s in North Korea
Years of the 20th century in North Korea
North Korea